Jirayu (from , is a Thai given name.  People with this name include:

 Chirayu Isarangkun Na Ayuthaya, Thai economist and court official
 Chirayu Navawongs, Thai scholar and privy council member
 Jirayu La-ongmanee, Thai actor
 Jirayu Tangsrisuk, Thai actor
 Jirayu Raksakaew, Thai volleyball player

Thai given names
Thai masculine given names